The 2019–20 Toto Cup Al was the 35th season of the third-tier football tournament in Israel since its introduction and the 14th tournament involving Israeli Premier League clubs only.

Maccabi Tel Aviv were the defending champions.

Format changes

The four clubs playing in the Champions League and Europa League (Maccabi Tel Aviv, Bnei Yehuda Tel Aviv, Maccabi Haifa and Hapoel Be'er Sheva) will not take part in the group stage, while the remaining ten clubs were divided into two groups of five clubs. At the end of the group stage each of the group winners will qualify to the semi-finals.
Maccabi Tel Aviv and Bnei Yehuda Tel Aviv will play (in the 2019 Israel Super Cup match) for a place in one of the semi-finals (meeting the group winner with the fewest points accumulated), while Maccabi Haifa and Hapoel Be'er Sheva will play for a place in the other semi-final (meeting the group winner with the most points accumulated). All the clubs will participate in classification play-offs.

Group stage

Groups were allocated according to geographic distribution of the clubs, with the northern clubs allocated to Group A, and the southern clubs allocated to Group B. Each club will play the other clubs once.

The matches are scheduled to start on 27 July 2019.

Group A

Group B

European qualification route

Israel Super Cup

UEFA qualifiers match

Classification play-offs

5–6th classification match

7–8th classification match

9–10th classification match

11–12th classification match

13–14th classification match

Semi-finals

Final

Final rankings

References

External links

Al
Toto Cup Al
Israel